Greenbrier West High School is a public high school located in Charmco, West Virginia, United States. It serves 440 students in grades 9-12.

Athletics
Greenbrier West participates in athletics under the nickname Cavaliers. It competes in class A of the West Virginia Secondary School Activities Commission.

References

External links
 

Public high schools in West Virginia
Schools in Greenbrier County, West Virginia